The 2010–11 Petron Blaze Boosters season was the 36th season of the franchise in the Philippine Basketball Association (PBA). The team was known as the San Miguel Beermen for the duration of the Philippine and Commissioner's Cups.

Key dates
August 29, 2010: The 2010 PBA Draft took place in Fort Bonifacio, Taguig.
March 2011: San Miguel Corporation (SMC) announced that the franchise shall be playing under the name Petron Blaze Boosters, beginning the 2011 PBA Governors Cup. SMC had acquired majority control of Petron Corporation in December 2010.

Draft picks

Roster

Philippine Cup

Eliminations

Standings

Finals

Commissioner's Cup

Eliminations

Standings

Governors Cup

Eliminations

Standings

Semifinals

Standings

Finals

Transactions

Pre-season

Trades

Philippine Cup

Free agents

Additions

Trades

Commissioner's Cup

Conditional dispersal draft

Trades

Imports recruited

References

San Miguel Beermen seasons
Petron